Adney is an English locative name from Adeney. Notable people with this surname include:

 Syed Adney (born 1986), Malaysian footballer 
 Tappan Adney (1868–1950), American-Canadian artist, a writer and a photographer

See also 
 Adeney (surname)

References 

English toponymic surnames